Inert waste is waste which is neither chemically nor biologically reactive and will not decompose or only very slowly. Examples of this are sand and concrete. This has particular relevance to landfills as inert waste typically requires lower disposal fees than biodegradable waste or hazardous waste.

See also
Landfill
List of waste types

References

Waste